Zhàozhōu Cōngshěn (Wade-Giles: Chao-chou Ts'ung-shen) (778–897) was a Chán (Zen) Buddhist master especially known for his "paradoxical statements and strange deeds".

Zhaozhou became ordained as a monk at an early age. At the age of 18, he met Nánquán Pǔyuàn (南泉普願 748–835; J: Nansen Fugan), a successor of Mǎzǔ Dàoyī (709–788; J. Baso Do-itsu), and eventually received the Dharma from him. When Nanquan asked Zhaozhou the koan "What is the Way?", the two had a dialogue, at the height of which Zhaozhou attained enlightenment. Zhaozhou continued to practice under Nanquan until the latter's death.

Subsequently, Zhaozhou began to travel throughout China, visiting the prominent Chan masters of the time before finally, at the age of eighty, settling in Guānyīnyuàn (觀音院), a ruined temple in northern China. There, for the next 40 years, he taught a small group of monks.

Zhaozhou is sometimes touted as the greatest Chan master of Tang dynasty China during a time when its hegemony was disintegrating as more and more regional military governors (jiédùshǐ) began to assert their power. Zhaozhou's lineage died out quickly due to the many wars and frequent purges of Buddhism in China at the time, and cannot be documented beyond the year 1000.

Zhaozhou is remembered for his verbal inventiveness and sense of humor. One of his recorded sayings is:

Many koans in both the Blue Cliff Record and The Gateless Gate concern Zhaozhou, with twelve cases in the former and five in the latter being attributed to him. He is, however, probably best known for the first koan in The Gateless Gate:

Bailin Temple in China, famous for his abbacy, was rebuilt after the Cultural Revolution and is nowadays again a prominent center of Chinese Buddhism.

References

Sources

Dumoulin, Heinrich. Zen Buddhism: A History. Volume 1: India and China. Tr. Heisig, James W. and Knitter, Paul. Bloomington, Indiana: World Wisdom, 2005.
Green, James; ed. and tr. The Recorded Sayings of Zen Master Joshu. Boston: Shambhala Publications, 1998. .
Hoffmann, Yoel, ed. and tr., Radical Zen: The Sayings of Joshu. Bantam press, 1978.

External links
 
 

778 births
897 deaths
Chan Buddhist monks
Tang dynasty Buddhist monks
Chinese centenarians
Chinese Zen Buddhists
Men centenarians